Jennifer Rizkallah (born 11 March 1997) is a Lebanese swimmer. She competed in the women's 50 metre backstroke event at the 2017 World Aquatics Championships.

References

1997 births
Living people
Lebanese female swimmers
Place of birth missing (living people)
Female backstroke swimmers